Wah (Urdu/) is a city in Rawalpindi District, Punjab, in Pakistan.  It is famous for the Wah Cantonment, a military camp located in the north of the city.  Wah includes a university known as the University of Wah and is close to its sister town of Taxila, located in the same tehsil.

Wah Cantonment 

The majority of the city includes the Wah Cantonment, a military camp in Punjab province located in the north of Punjab.  The military camp is near Taxila Cantonment.

History 
A village without a name located in present-day Wah, was called "Wah" when Mughal emperor Jehangir came back from Kashmir and after he arrived in the village he said "Wah".  Wah is also adjacent to Taxila, and shares much of its early history with the Indus Valley Civilization. It is connected by road with Peshawar, Islamabad, and Rawalpindi and is a growing industrial centre. On August 21, 2008, Wah was attacked in a suicide bombing.

Demographics 
According to a census taken in 2019, the population of Wah, including the cantonment, is around 410,000.  The population of the cantonment is a little above 300,000.  Wah is the 24th largest city of Pakistan.  The majority of the people speak Punjabi, while the main ethnic groups are Jat, Rajput, Arain, Gujjar, and Awan.

University 

The University of Wah is a private university located outside the military camp.  It is one of the best universities in Punjab.

References

Populated places in Rawalpindi District
Populated places established in the 16th century

.